Scott Oliver Henry (born 14 February 1989, in Mudgee, New South Wales) was an Australian cricketer who played for New South Wales and Queensland.

A left-handed batsman, he made his first class debut playing for New South Wales against Victoria in October 2011.

Henry scored an unbeaten double century against the touring Sri Lanka's in 2012 and hit a half century on his Ryobi cup debut against Western Australia at the WACA in Perth.

He played regularly including every game of the 2014–15 Sheffield Shield season but was cut from the squad following the signing of test cricketer Ed Cowan.

Following a move to Queensland, he scored a century on debut in October 2015. It was his maiden first class century and came against Victoria at the MCG.

He completed an ACA internship programme at Queensland cricket in the commercial and marketing team.
 
He took up a position as Operations Manager at University of Queensland Cricket Club in January 2018.

He played one game for the Melbourne Stars in December 2012 during 2012–13 Big Bash League season, scoring 6 runs before being run out. He then signed to play for the Sydney Thunder in the Big Bash League for 2014–15 season, but did not play any more T20 games.

See also
 List of New South Wales representative cricketers

References

 

1989 births
Living people
Sportsmen from New South Wales
New South Wales cricketers
Melbourne Stars cricketers
Australian cricketers
People from Mudgee